Micah Newby House, also known as the Newby-Bick House, is a historic home located in Clay Township, Hamilton County, Indiana.  Records indicate that the farm was acquired in August, 1871, by Micah Newby from his father, John Henley Newby.

Although no precise date of construction is known, Ovid Newby, grandson of Micah Newby, documented that his father, John Absalom Newby, born 1877, was age four when the family finished the house (circa 1880). It is a two-story, nearly symmetrical "T"-shaped plan frame home in the vernacular Italianate style.  It was restored in the 1980s.

It was listed on the National Register of Historic Places in 1986.

References

Houses on the National Register of Historic Places in Indiana
Italianate architecture in Indiana
Houses completed in 1880
Buildings and structures in Hamilton County, Indiana
National Register of Historic Places in Hamilton County, Indiana